This is a list of the royal consorts of the Kingdom of Galicia. It is, in part, a continuation of the list of Asturian consorts.

Royal consorts of Galicia

Suebic queens in Gallaecia
NN (February 449–456), daughter of Theodoric I of the Ostrogoths, wife of Rechiar
NN (464–469), mention as a Gothic princess possibly daughter of Theodoric II of the Ostrogoths, wife of Rechiar
Sisegutia (570–583, 584–585), wife of Miro and 2nd wife of Andeca
NN (584), daughter of Miro, 1st wife of Andeca

House of Alfonso

See also
List of Gothic queens
List of Hispanic consorts
List of Asturian royal consorts
List of Castilian royal consorts
List of Aragonese royal consorts
List of Leonese royal consorts
List of Spanish royal consorts

Notes

 
Galicia queens consorts, List of
Galician